San Francisco de Asis is a town within the  municipality of the Atotonilco El Alto located in the southeastern part of the state of Jalisco in Mexico. It is named after the Italian  Saint Francis of Assisi. At the time of the census of 2005 the town had a population of 5,167 inhabitants. Its most distinctive features are the Fine Sanctuary of Our Lady of Los Altos and the fact that new tequila factories are located there. Its surrounding municipality of the same name had an area of 1,532.78 km² (591.81 sq mi) and a population in conjunction of Atotonilco el alto of 126,625 in the 2005 census, but its territory is increasing significantly since the beginning of 2005 with the creation of the new housing, churches, and schools.

Ancestry 
Traditionally, the region of San Francisco de Asis is known for its inhabitants of French, German, Italian, Fenicia and Spanish ancestry  strong family and Roman Catholic values. The families Hernandez
,Flores, Vasquez, and Avina are some of the original families that settled in the town, these families come from Spanish, Italian, Cuban, Aztecs, and german background. Most young men leave town to work in the United States. Men arrive from out of state and abroad in hopes of finding a pretty girl with traditional family values.

Also worth noting is the growing number of distinguished expatriates who emigrated to the US. These now reside particularly in California, Nashville, Houston, South Dallas, and Chicago metropolitan area.

San Francisco de Asis Plaza 

Plaza providing outdoor entertainment, sitting areas, fountains, and sometimes kiosks. Many Youths and Elders walk around there at every Sunday Afternoon. Plaza. There consists of many ice cream vendors surrounding the plaza, panderias, and local vendors to sell food on Sunday evenings.

A traditional Sunday night consists of many going to church and either going to visit near relatives, or heading to eat with a  group of friends or family.

References

Populated places in Jalisco